Two Nuns and a Pack Mule is the only studio album by the Chicago noise rock band Rapeman, released by Touch & Go Records on August 23, 1988. The CD re-release contained the Budd extended play in its entirety.

Reception

The indie music press largely applauded the album as the much awaited studio follow-up to Albini’s work with Big Black. Trouser Press compared it favorably to their previous release, writing that the album "fits Albini's distinctive meltdown guitar and shriek vocals into rough song forms [...] Rapeman spits out sparks with the conviction of Albini's acerbic intelligence."

In retrospective reviews, Jason Ankeny of AllMusic wrote that the album "varies in its attack in ways Albini's old trio Big Black never did; the demented rhythms constantly threaten to veer out of control, and Albini's guitar screeches like something rabid and bloodthirsty", sarcastically writing that lyrically, "the group displays the same warmth and compassion so evident in their choice of a name [...] songs tackle sex ("Trouser Minnow"), ethnicity ("Hated Chinee"), and classic rock ("Radar Love Lizard")."  FACT Magazine ranked it the 28th best album of the 1980s, calling the "oft-overlooked" album "one of Albini’s greatest moments on the other side of the production desk." Dominick Fernow of Prurient-fame wrote that the album "was one of the first rock records I ever heard that made me question owning it [...] quite possibly the last dangerous rock album made?"

Track listing
All songs written by Rapeman, except where noted.

Side Yo
 "Steak and Black Onions" – 2:47
 "Monobrow" – 3:45
 "Up Beat" – 2:15
 "Coition Ignition Mission" – 2:23
 "Kim Gordon's Panties" – 4:17

Side Mo
 "Hated Chinee" – 2:01
 "Marmoset" – 1:50
 "Radar Love Lizard" – 2:12
 "Just Got Paid" – 3:35 (originally by ZZ Top)
 "Trouser Minnow" – 4:06

Bonus tracks on CD edition, originally from the Budd EP
 "Budd" – 7:29
 "Superpussy" – 2:12
 "Log Bass" – 2:23
 "Dutch Courage" – 2:40

The tracks "Marmoset" and "Radar Love Lizard" were mistakenly listed in reverse order on the vinyl edition's track listing. Their titles were mistakenly swapped on the CD version.

The inner sleeve contained explanations of the lyrical content for the tracks:
 "We Don't Hate Vegetarians, We Just Think They Are Funny"
 "Singular Eyebrow as a Fashion Statement"
 "Puny But Angry"
 "A Professed Goal of Space Program; Conception and Birth in Space"
 "Blatant Coachmen Rip off"
 "Lotten Flucking Ruck"
 "Golden Earring Tribute/Reptile Tendencies"
 "Lincoln Park Zoo Nocturnal Mammal Building/Failed Hummer"
 "Bonus Edgar Blossom Muchas Gracias"
 "Men Suck"

Personnel
Steve Albini – guitar, vocals
David Wm. Sims – bass guitar, co-vocals on "Just Got Paid"
Rey Washam – drums

Production
Fluss, Steve Albini – production
Kerry Crafton – engineering

External links
Touch & Go Records page on the album

References

Albums produced by Steve Albini
1988 debut albums
Touch and Go Records albums
Rapeman albums
Blast First albums
Au Go Go Records albums